Casablanca Technopark is an information technology business cluster complex located at Casablanca, Morocco. It was inaugurated in October 2001.

Background
It is Morocco's first industrial park. The building was designed by Mourad Ben Embarek. The project is under the supervision of Ministry of Commerce, Industry and ICT and had Omar Balafrej as its general manager. Its main specialties are software engineering and IT ventures.

Activities
The project has many main activities such as offering training e-learning as well as being a relay center between multinational companies specialized in Information Technology and their subsidiaries.

The project is a joint venture between:
 Moroccan Government - 35% of the capital
 a consortium of Moroccan private banks ("La Caisse de Dépôt et de Gestion", "BMCE Bank", "La Banque Centrale Populaire", "Banque Commerciale du Maroc" and "AttijariWafa Bank") - 65%

, CT is hosting 132 companies divided into 55 start-ups, 67 medium-sized companies, 4 big companies and 6 training centers.

Events
The fifth edition of "MED-IT 2006" was held in Casablanca Technopark from June 14 to June 15, 2006.

Notable Technopark companies
 Al Akhawayn University
 Bull Maroc
 Maroc Telecom
 SAGEM
 USAID

References

External links
 Official website
 Official blog
 Photo gallery

Technopark
Science parks in Morocco